Amadeusz Kłodawski (born 3 March 1987) is a Polish footballer (winger) playing currently for Polonia Warsaw. He joined Polonia in 2008 from Dyskobolia Grodzisk Wielkopolski. Kłodawski scored the only goal in the game versus FK MKT Araz Imisli which gave Dyskobolia Grodzisk Wielkopolski the promotion to the next round of UEFA Cup 2007-08.

Kłodawski made his debut in the Polish Ekstraklasa as a late game substitute in a match against Jagiellonia Białystok on 5 August 2007.

External links
 

Living people
1987 births
Polish footballers
Dyskobolia Grodzisk Wielkopolski players
Polonia Warsaw players
Association football midfielders
People from Kostrzyn nad Odrą
Sportspeople from Lubusz Voivodeship